Iowa Highway 38 (Iowa 38) is a   state highway that runs through eastern Iowa.  Iowa 38 begins at Iowa Highway 92 in Muscatine and ends at Iowa Highway 3 near Greeley.

Route description
Iowa 38 begins in Muscatine at an intersection with Iowa 92 at the foot of the Norbert F. Beckey Bridge.  Southwest of the junction, U.S. Highway 61 Business (US 61 Business) heads into the downtown and riverfront areas, while northeast of the junction, US 61 Business, Iowa 38,  and Iowa 92 run together through a residential area.  Shortly thereafter, Iowa 22 joins the two routes from the east.  The intersection with U.S. Highway 61 (US 61) in northern Muscatine marks the end of US 61 Bus.  Iowa 22 and Iowa 92 turn to the west along southbound US 61.

From Muscatine, Iowa 38 continues north  to the southern intersection with US 6 south of Wilton. Just north of Wilton, US 6 / Iowa 38 cross into Cedar County. Shortly thereafter, they intersect Interstate 80 (I-80) and split in opposite directions; US 6 splits to the east and Iowa 38 to the west. Iowa 38 overlaps I-80 from exit 267 to exit 271. From I-80, the highway continues north towards Tipton where it meets the western end of Iowa 130.

Iowa 38 enters Jones County south of Olin and crosses the Wapsipinicon River on Olin's northern edge.  later, Iowa 38 intersects Iowa 64, which Iowa 38 overlaps for  before heading north towards Monticello passing through Center Junction and Scotch Grove. Next to the Monticello Regional Airport, Iowa 38 meets US 151.  later, Iowa 38 meets and overlaps the former alignment of US 151, now US 151 Business. At First Street, it leaves US 151 Bus to the west for a few blocks before turning north again towards Hopkinton and crossing the Maquoketa River.

Just north of Sand Springs, Iowa 38 intersects County Road X47 (CR X47), which is a cutoff to eastbound US 20. From Hopkinton to Delhi, the highway is roughly parallel to the Maquoketa River. At Delaware, Iowa 38 intersects US 20. Iowa 38 briefly overlaps US 20's former routing, now CR D22, north of Delaware.

History
Iowa 38 (No. 38) is an original state highway when the system was created in 1920.  It extended from Primary Road No. 2 and No. 20 in Muscatine north to No. 61 between Anamosa and Wyoming.  When the U.S. Highway System was created in 1926, the terminal roads of Iowa 38 were renumbered to Iowa 22 at Muscatine and Iowa 117 in Jones County.  Throughout the 1930s, the highway was extended several times.  Firstly, in 1932, it was extended over Iowa 117 for a couple miles and then north as a stub route to Center Junction.  Three years later, it was again extended north to U.S. Highway 151 in Monticello.  Finally on May 11, 1938, it absorbed all of Iowa 113, which had connected Monticello to Iowa 10 near Edgewood.

Major intersections

References

External links

 End of Iowa 38 at Iowa Highway Ends

038
Transportation in Muscatine County, Iowa
Transportation in Cedar County, Iowa
Transportation in Jones County, Iowa
Transportation in Delaware County, Iowa
Muscatine, Iowa micropolitan area